The 2016–17 Missouri Tigers men's basketball team represented the University of Missouri in the 2016–17 NCAA Division I men's basketball season. Their head coach was Kim Anderson, who was in his third year as the head coach at Missouri. The team played its home games at Mizzou Arena in Columbia, Missouri, and was in its fifth season in the Southeastern Conference. They finished the season 8–24, 2–16 in SEC play to finish in a tie for 13th place. As the No. 14 seed in the SEC tournament, they defeated Auburn in the first round before losing in the second round to Ole Miss.

On March 5, 2017, head coach Kim Anderson was asked to step down as head coach of the Tigers following the season. He was allowed to coach the team in the SEC tournament. On March 15, the school hired Cuonzo Martin as head coach.

Previous season 
The Tigers finished the 2015–16 season 10–21, 3–15 in SEC play to finish in last place. Due to a self-imposed postseason ban, Missouri did not participate in the SEC tournament.

Departures

Incoming transfers

2016 recruits

Future recruits

2017 recruiting class

Roster

Schedule and results

|-
!colspan=12 style=| Exhibition

|-
!colspan=12 style=| Non-conference regular season

|-
!colspan=12 style=|SEC regular season

|-
!colspan=12 style=| SEC Tournament

References

Missouri Tigers men's basketball seasons
Missouri
Tiger
Tiger